Manock, also spelled Mannock, is a surname. It may refer to:

Edward Manock (1904 – 1908), English professional footballer
Jerry Manock, American industrial designer and product designer for Apple Inc.
Kitty Mannock, a fictional character created by novelist Clive Cussler
Mannock Baronets, a Baronetage of England title
Mick Mannock (1887 – 1918), British World War I flying ace